The Simpsons Skateboarding is a sports video game based on the animated sitcom The Simpsons. It was released for the PlayStation 2 in North America on 12 November 2002 and Europe on 6 December 2002. The game was developed by The Code Monkeys and published by Fox Interactive and Electronic Arts. The story and dialogue were written by writers from The Simpsons, with all character voices supplied by the cast. The game was widely panned by critics.

Gameplay
Springfield has been converted into a skate park for the Annual Skate Tour, full of skate-able objects and landmarks from the television series. Players are able to choose one of the nine characters available and compete for the grand prize. All of the characters' voices were recorded by the actual voice actors from The Simpsons. Each character has over forty unique moves. Players can test their skills in either a two-player head-to-head skate off, or in one of the fast and furious modes: Freeskate, Skate Fest, Trick Contest, and a game of skateboard H-O-R-S-E, unlocking additional characters, locations, and skateboards. Players can also choose to learn all the skateboard moves and tricks before they begin the actual game in the Skillz School mode.

Development
The Simpsons Skateboarding was developed by The Code Monkeys and published by Electronic Arts (EA) under license from Fox Interactive. Before EA made an official announcement about The Simpsons Skateboarding, an advertisement for the game was featured on the back page of the instruction manual for The Simpsons: Road Rage, and on in-game billboards, which was released in 2001. There were no mention of a console in the advertisement and no gameplay details were revealed. In November 2001, EA representatives said they were not ready to comment on the product. On 16 May 2002, a few days before the E3 Media and Business Summit, they released their first piece of information about the game. All of the characters' voices were recorded by the actual voice actors from The Simpsons.

Reception

The Simpsons Skateboarding received "unfavorable" reviews according to the review aggregation website Metacritic. It was criticized for its chunky graphics, poorly recorded sound and music, lack of skateboarding tricks, and poor controls whilst the in-game dialogue were mixed.

Andrew Reiner of Game Informer said: "Never before have I seen a developer put forth such an effort to secure the Worst Game of the Year award. I'll even go as far to say that this may very well be the worst PlayStation 2 game on the market." Kevin Murphy of GameSpy said that "The Simpsons Skateboarding should be a case study in bad game design."

References

External links
 
 

2002 video games
Electronic Arts games
Fox Interactive games
Multiplayer and single-player video games
PlayStation 2 games
PlayStation 2-only games
RenderWare games
Skateboarding video games
Skateboarding
Video games developed in the United Kingdom
Video games set in the United States